This is a list of Arizona Rangers people who served in the Arizona Rangers between 1901 and 1909.

Captains

Lieutenants

Sergeants

Privates

See also

 List of Old West gunfighters
 List of Old West gunfights
 List of Old West lawmen
 List of people from Arizona

References

American Old West-related lists

Lists of American people by occupation
Rangers